Tahira Qazi (1 July 1951 – 16 December 2014) was a Pakistani educationist and principal of Army Public School Peshawar who was killed in the Peshawar school attack on 16 December 2014.

Early life and career 
Tahira Qazi was born on 1 July 1951 in Mardan, Pakistan where she attended early schooling. She completed her master's degree in English from University of Peshawar and started her teaching career in the 1970s. Qazi married Pakistan Army colonel (now retired) Qazi Zafrullah in the 1980s. She was principal of Army Public School, Peshawar since 2006 and was set to retire in May 2015. According to her students, she taught English.

Death
On 16 December 2014, Tehrik-i-Taliban Pakistan affiliated terrorists attacked Army Public School Peshawar. During the attack, Qazi tried to protect the students and jumped forward in front of the militants and said, "I am their mother. Talk to me." She was then set on fire, allegedly in front of her students, for being the spouse of a senior army officer.

Qazi was laid to rest in Landi Arbab. She was survived by her husband, a daughter, and two sons.

Awards and honors 
Qazi was posthumously awarded by Sitara-e-Shujaat on Pakistan Day 2015 by President Mamnoon Hussain. A conference room of Khyber Pakhtunkhwa Assembly was renamed after her, as the "Tahira Qazi Conference Room".

See also
 School massacres
 Syed Hamid Hussain
 Aitzaz Hassan

References

1951 births
2014 deaths
Deaths by firearm in Pakistan
Crime in Peshawar
Pakistani school principals and headteachers
Victims of the Tehrik-i-Taliban Pakistan
Mass murder victims
2014 murders in Pakistan
2014 Peshawar school massacre
21st-century women educators